Robert Reale (born 1956) is an American composer with a long list of credits in film, TV and theater.  He is also the owner of 4 Elements Music and 8118 Music.

Reale regularly works with younger brother Willie Reale. In 2003 he was nominated for a Tony Award for A Year with Frog and Toad for Best Original Musical Score. As composer and record producer he has worked with Julie Andrews, Mel Tormé, Sid Caesar and Imogene Coca.

Composer (Musicals)
Johnny Baseball (2010 musical) (American Repertory Theater)
The Dinosaur Musical (Arden Theatre Company (Philadelphia)) - 2005
A Year with Frog and Toad (Broadway) - 2003
Once Around The City (Off-Broadway) - 2001
Quark Victory (Williamstown Theatre Festival)

Composer (Music for plays)
Rounding Third (Off-Broadway) - 2003
Diva (Williamstown Theatre Festival)
Salvation's Moon (Off-Broadway)

Composer (Film)
Coach of the year (2015)
The Rebound, source music (2009), dir., Bart Freundlich 
Ten-13 (2002), dir., Carl Stillitano
The Victim (2002), (Patti LuPone, David Strathairn), dir., Doug Magee
Passing Over (1996), dir., Chris Ceraso  
Wigstock: The Movie (1995), dir., Barry Shills
Dealers Among Dealers (1995), (P.O.V. on PBS) dir., Gaylen Ross
The Rain Before The Wind (1993), BRNO 16 Audience Award, dir., Brian Heffron

Composer (TV)
On Assignment, theme
People's List, theme
Billions, YumTime (2016), dir., Scott Hornbacher
Brooklyn Nine-Nine
Legit (2013 TV series)
Good Morning America
Best in Film: The Greatest Movies of Our Time
The Nate Berkus Show
Cycling High: Doping to Win
Unraveled
Skywire Live
Four Weddings
The Presidents' Gatekeepers
Back to the Beginning
Hate In America
The Making of Trump
The Lookout (TV Series)
A Toast to 2014!
Thank You, America! with Robin Roberts
The Making of Peter Pan Live!
The Making of The Sound of Music Live!
ABC News Nightline (Prime Nightline)
Motive for Murder (TV Movie)
Shark Tank: Swimming with Sharks
Blue Bloods
Katie (talk show)
Countdown to the Oscars: 15 Movies that Changed American Cinema
Oscars Opening Ceremony: Live from the Red Carpet
Disappeared (TV Series)
Save My Life: Boston Trauma
American Scandals
7 New Signs of the Apocalypse
Beyond the Headlines
Haskett's Chance, Pilot (2006), dir., Tim Blake Nelson
Primetime (U.S. TV program)
20/20
Inside Edition
Caught on Camera
Caught on Camera with Nick Cannon
Caught on Camera: Terror in Boston
Mugshots
Crime Stories
The System
The Piranha and the Mailman
Case Closed
Beating The Rap
The Royals: Dynasty Or Disaster?
Out There (Theme)
Invent This! (Theme)

References

External links

1956 births
Living people
American male composers
21st-century American composers
21st-century American male musicians